A. R. Ramesh is an Indian film director who has worked on Tamil language films and television serials. He was active in feature films in the late 1990s, making action and romantic films.

Career
Ramesh made his directorial debut with Thayagam (1996) featuring Vijayakanth, and the success of the film saw him sign on for three ventures in a short span of time. He then made the romantic films, Dhinamum Ennai Gavani (1997) and Ini Ellam Sugame (1998), neither of which fared well at the box office. Ramesh also worked on the production of the multi-starrer Suyamvaram (1999) alongside nine other directors, and was given the responsibility of directing scenes involving Parthiban and Suvalakshmi. Ramesh also then worked on a bilingual action film titled Independence Day (2000), which was shot in Tamil and Kannada over a period of two years, with Arun Pandian and Saikumar in the lead roles. In 2001, he began production on a film titled Daddy starring Raghuvaran which was never materialised.

Filmography

Serials Directed

Produced & Directed

References

Living people
Tamil film directors
20th-century Indian film directors
1960 births